Paraschistura lindbergi is a species of stone loach found in Afghanistan and Pakistan.

Footnotes 

lindbergi
Fish of Asia
Fish described in 1965
Taxa named by Petre Mihai Bănărescu